Bjørn Inge Mo (16 March 1968 – 10 July 2022) was a Norwegian politician. A member of the Labour Party, he was mayor of Kåfjord from 2003 to 2015 and served in the Sámi Parliament of Norway from 2017 to 2020.

Mo died on 10 July 2022 at the age of 54.

References

1968 births
2022 deaths
People from Gáivuotna–Kåfjord
21st-century Norwegian politicians
Labour Party (Norway) politicians
Mayors of places in Troms
Members of the Sámi Parliament of Norway